Gariadhar is one of the 182 Legislative Assembly constituencies of Gujarat state in India. It is part of Bhavnagar district and it came into existence after 2008 delimitation.

List of segments
This assembly seat represents the following segments,

 Gariadhar Taluka
 Mahuva Taluka (Part) Villages – Jesar, Vavdi, Kotiya, Kalmodar, Ratanpar, Karmadiya, Matalpar, Beda, Chhapariyali, Karjala, Kobadiya, Intiya, Karla, Moda, Sarera, Bila, Tantaniya, Tol Saldi Chotila, Bhanvadiya, Dungarpar, Monpar, Bagdana, Titodiya, Dharai, Dudana, Borla, Samadhiyala No.3, Kumbhariya, Gundarana, Malpara, Saloli, Degavda, Khari, Vaghvadarda, Sedarda, Kotamoi, Shantinagar, Ugalvan, Moti Vadal, Modaliya, Akhegadh, Nana Asrana, Mota Khuntavada, Thorala, Bordi, Rajavadar, Shetrana, Belampar, Galthar, Jambuda, Nana Khuntvada, Kasan, Bhaguda, Moti Jagdhar, Longdi, Loyanga, Anganka, Khadsaliya, Chhapri, Chuna, Kakidi, Kalela.

Member of Legislative Assembly

Election results

2022

2017

2012

See also
 List of constituencies of the Gujarat Legislative Assembly
 Bhavnagar district
 Gujarat Legislative Assembly

References

External links
 

Assembly constituencies of Gujarat
Bhavnagar district